Growth model can refer to:

Population dynamics in demography

Economic growth
Solow–Swan model in macroeconomics
Fei-Ranis model of economic growth
Endogenous growth theory
Kaldor's growth model
Harrod-Domar model
W.A Lewis growth model
Rostow's stages of growth